Blair Hilton (born 28 August 1989 in Wellington) is a New Zealand field hockey player. At the 2012 Summer Olympics and 2016 Summer Olympics, he competed for the national team in the men's tournament.  He also competed for New Zealand at the 2010 and 2014 Commonwealth Games.

Of Māori descent, Hilton affiliates to the Ngāpuhi iwi.

References

External links
 

1989 births
Living people
New Zealand male field hockey players
Olympic field hockey players of New Zealand
Field hockey players at the 2012 Summer Olympics
Field hockey players at the 2016 Summer Olympics
Commonwealth Games medallists in field hockey
Commonwealth Games bronze medallists for New Zealand
Field hockey players at the 2010 Commonwealth Games
Field hockey players from Wellington City
New Zealand Māori sportspeople
Ngāpuhi people
People educated at Tawa College
Field hockey players at the 2014 Commonwealth Games
2010 Men's Hockey World Cup players
2014 Men's Hockey World Cup players
20th-century New Zealand people
21st-century New Zealand people
Medallists at the 2010 Commonwealth Games